Westchester Stakes may refer to:

 Westchester Stakes, former name of the defunct event Willard L. Proctor Memorial Stakes last held at Hollywood Park, California
 Westchester Stakes (NYRA), a New York Racing Association event held at Belmont Park on Long Island, New York